Annabelle Wallis (born 5 September 1984) is an English actress. She is known for her roles as Jane Seymour in Showtime's period drama The Tudors (2009–2010), Grace Burgess in the BBC drama Peaky Blinders (2013–2022), Mia Form in the supernatural horror film Annabelle (2014), Jenny Halsey in the supernatural adventure film The Mummy (2017), Sandra in Silent Night (2021) and Madison Mitchell in the horror film Malignant (2021).

Early life 
Wallis was born on 5 September 1984 in Oxford. Her maternal great-uncle was the Irish actor Richard Harris. Her English first cousins once removed include the actors Jared Harris, Jamie Harris, and the director Damian Harris. On her father's side, she is a descendant of English singer Marie Lloyd. Her older brother, Francis, is a director who has worked for fashion designer Michael Kors and singers Pixie Lott and Birdy.

She was raised in the Portuguese municipality of Cascais, to where her family emigrated when she was 18 months old. As a result of attending international schools, she speaks fluent English, Portuguese, French, and Spanish.

Career

2005–2012: Career beginnings 
In Portugal, Wallis appeared in several short films before she moved to London to pursue a career in film. In London, she did some advertisements and looked into drama schools before ultimately deciding to find an agent.

In 2005 she landed a lead role in the Bollywood film Dil Jo Bhi Kahey... (or "Whatever the Heart Says"). The film did not fare well at the box office. She landed small parts in True True Lie (2006) alongside Jaime King and Body of Lies (2008) in which she played Mark Strong’s girlfriend. She starred in the B-movie Steel Trap (2008).

In television, her breakthrough was in season three of the Showtime drama series The Tudors (2009) as Jane Seymour. She replaced actress Anita Briem. In the following years, she starred in the television film The Lost Future (2010) alongside Sam Claflin and in the ABC series Pan Am (2011). The show was cancelled after one season due to a drop in viewership.

In 2011, she was directed by Madonna in W.E.: Wallis & Edouard and had a small part in X-Men: First Class. In 2012, she appeared in Jared Leto's documentary, Artifact, and in Snow White and the Huntsman, but was not credited.

2013–2017: Peaky Blinders and blockbusters 

Wallis starred as Grace Burgess in the BBC drama Peaky Blinders, from 2013 to 2016. Her role allowed her to be "believable in a strong, female, alpha role." The series was met with critical and public acclaim.

In 2014, she joined The Conjuring Universe with a leading role in the horror film Annabelle, directed by John R. Leonetti and produced by James Wan. The film was a box-office success and received negative reviews. Critics praised Wallis's performance, and she was nominated at the 2015's MTV Movie & TV Awards for Best Scared-As-S**t Performance. She returned as Mia Form in Annabelle: Creation (2017).

In 2014, she also portrayed Muriel Wright, the original Bond girl, on the mini-series Fleming: The Man Who Would Be Bond alongside actor Dominic Cooper.

In 2016, she starred in the action comedy film The Brothers Grimsby, the drama Come and Find Me and the psychological thriller war film Mine.

In 2017, Wallis joined the Dark Universe created by Universal Pictures and starred as archaeologist Jenny Halsey in The Mummy, a reboot of The Mummy franchise. Wallis did almost all of her stunts herself including a Zero-G scene that almost killed her. The film received negative reviews and was a box office bomb. The same year she joined Guy Ritchie's King Arthur: Legend of the Sword.

2018–present: Diversification and leading parts 
In 2018, Wallis landed a lead in the American comedy Tag as Rebecca Crosby. Later that year, Wallis reunited with film director Alex Kurtzman for the Star Trek: Short Treks episode "Calypso", where she lent her voice to an artificial intelligence called Zora. She would later reprise this role in a recurring fashion on Star Trek: Discovery.

In April 2018, she was announced to be Cartier's ambassador for jewellery and the new face of the Panthère de Cartier watch.

In 2019, Wallis joined Showtime's mini-series The Loudest Voice. She portrays Laurie Luhn, Head of Booking at Fox News Channel and Roger Ailes's long-time "mistress". Luhn is one of Ailes's first victims to talk and denounce him, alongside Gretchen Carlson. The series received generally favourable reviews and was nominated at the Golden Globe Awards for Best Limited Series or Television Film. Wallis's performance was praised and seen as an "heartbreakingly powerful work" according to the Chicago Sun Times.

Later that year, Wallis reprised her role as Grace Shelby in the fifth season of Peaky Blinders.

In 2020, she starred in Robin Pront's thriller The Silencing. The film was supposed to premiere at the South by Southwest festival in March 2020 but it was cancelled due to the COVID-19 pandemic and was finally released on DirecTV on 16 July 2020.

This same year, Wallis starred as Princess Buttercup in The Princess Bride for Quibi to raise money for World Central Kitchen and she joined the cast of Floria Sigismondi's third film, The Silence of Mercy. Shooting ended in March 2021.

In 2021, Wallis starred in James Wan's horror film Malignant. Scheduled by Warner Bros to premiere in August 2020, the release was postponed due to the COVID-19 pandemic, opening on 10 September 2021, simultaneously in theaters and on HBO Max. The film is a tribute to the giallo genre, and follows Madison Mitchell, played by Wallis, who is "paralyzed by shocking visions of grisly murders," and as her torment continues, "discovers that these waking dreams are in fact terrifying realities." It is the first R-Rated US movie to be released in China.

This same year, Wallis appeared in the science fiction action film Boss Level directed by Joe Carnahan, starring Frank Grillo and Mel Gibson and starred in Agata Alexander's science fiction thriller Warning, alongside Alice Eve and Alex Pettyfer.

In September 2021, the Christmas comedy Silent Night, directed by Camille Griffin, premiered at the Toronto International Film Festival. Wallis stars alongside Keira Knightley, Matthew Goode and Roman Griffin Davis.

Activism and philanthropy 
Wallis is a feminist. In February 2018, she attended the Letters Live event curated by Net-à-Porter in Los Angeles, where she read a letter from suffragette Emmeline Pankhurst. The money raised was donated to Women for Women International.

Wallis spoke out against Brexit and participated in the June 2018 #DontFuckMyFuture campaign to encourage young people to vote against it.

Wallis supports Save The Children and participated to the #ChristmasJumper campaign in November 2018. In September 2019, she joined the U.n.I (You and I) project for UNICEF. She is committed to the NGO Choose Love (formerly Help Refugees), which provides humanitarian aid to refugees around the world and advocates for them. She attended the launch of the Choose Love's store in Los Angeles in December 2019.

In April 2020, during the COVID-19 pandemic, Wallis teamed up with her friend and fashion designer Georgia Hardinge to raise funds for the charity Age UK. Along with other celebrities, she joined the movement #SaveWithStories in partnership with Save The Children and No Kid Hungry. The movement aims to provide fun and education to kids and parents stuck at home during the pandemic. The donations made to #SaveWithStories will help children and families most affected by the COVID-19 crisis around the world by providing them with food, access to early learning resources, and household goods.

Personal life 
Wallis was in an on-off relationship with British singer Chris Martin from August 2015 to August 2017. She performed vocals on the song "Up&Up", the final track on the album A Head Full of Dreams by Martin's band Coldplay. 

From April 2018 to March 2022, Wallis was in a relationship with American actor Chris Pine.

Filmography

Film

Television

Music videos

Discography 
 A Head Full of Dreams, vocals on song "Up&Up".

References

External links 

 

1984 births
Living people
Actresses from London
Actresses from Oxfordshire
British expatriate actresses in the United States
English expatriates in Portugal
English expatriates in the United States
English feminists
English film actresses
English people of Irish descent
English television actresses
People from Cascais
People from Oxford
21st-century English actresses